The Carey Act of 1894 (also known as the Federal Desert Land Act) allowed private companies in the U.S. to erect irrigation systems in the western semi-arid states, and profit from the sales of water. The Carey Act was enacted into law by Congress by the Act of August 18, 1894 (28 Stat. 422), as amended (43 U.S.C. 641 et seq.).  It was a new approach for the disposal of public desert land, as the federal government decided this task was too large for individual settlers.  Through advertising, these companies attracted farmers to the many states which successfully utilized the act, notably Idaho and Wyoming.

Senator Joseph Maull Carey of Wyoming introduced the bill in 1892 but it was not passed by Congress until 1894 when it was attached as a compromise measure to the 1894 Civil Appropriations Bill.   The Act established the General Land Office, which was controlled by the federal government. This land office assigned as many as one million acres (4,000 km²) of land for each western state. Each state then had to regulate the new land, selecting private contractors, selecting settlers, and the maximum price they could charge for water. Potential settlers who met specific requirements were granted  each. Projects were financed by the development companies, who eventually handed over control to an operating company.

In most states, settlers had to pay an entry fee, plus a small amount for the land, and meet several guidelines. In Iowa, for example, settlers had to cultivate and irrigate at least one sixteenth of their parcel within one year from the date which water became available. After another year, one eighth had to be cultivated, and by the third year — had the settler lived in the land, and paid all necessary fees — they would receive the deed to that parcel.

In general, the act was not as successful as intended, because few western states had the financial resources to make it effective. However, both Idaho and Wyoming achieved some successes. In 1908 Idaho received an additional two million acres (8,000 km²) and Wyoming received an additional one million acres (4,000 km²) of land to develop under the Carey Act. Today, approximately 60% of the Carey Act lands irrigated in the United States are in Idaho. Examples of successful Carey Act projects include Boise, Minidoka and Twin Falls. Wyoming was home to some of the first projects under the Carey Act, including the Cody Canal financed by a group of investors led by William F. Cody and supported by then state engineer Elwood Mead. Many of Wyoming's irrigation projects also began following World War II. Wyoming senator Francis E. Warren was also responsible for bringing the Carey Act to effect.

References

See also
 Newlands Reclamation Act of 1902
 Timber and Stone Act
 Homestead Act
 Public domain (land)

1894 in law
United States federal public land legislation
Water resource management in the United States
United States federal legislation articles without infoboxes